Digrammia pertinata is a species of geometrid moth in the family Geometridae. It is found in North America.

The MONA or Hodges number for Digrammia pertinata is 6365.

References

Further reading

 
 
 
 
 
 
 
 
 

Macariini
Articles created by Qbugbot
Moths described in 1939